South Carolina Highway 303 (SC 303) is a  state highway in the U.S. state of South Carolina. Known as the Green Pond Highway, it connects Green Pond and Walterboro.

Route description
SC 303 begins at an intersection with U.S. Route 17 (US 17; ACE Basin Parkway) south-southeast of Green Pond, Colleton County, where the roadway continues as Donnelley Drive. This intersection in on the northwestern corner of the Donnelley Wildlife Management Area. It travels to the north-northwest and enters Green Pond, where it crosses railroad tracks. It then crosses Ashepoo River and travels through Ritter. Farther to the north-northwest, it enters Walterboro, where it meets its northern terminus, an intersection with US 17 Alternate/SC 63 (Jefferies Boulevard).

History

Major intersections

See also

References

External links

 
 SC 303 at Virginia Highways' South Carolina Highways Annex

303
Transportation in Colleton County, South Carolina